Tragedy is an American hardcore punk band formed in 1999 in Portland, Oregon.

Band members
 Todd Burdette – guitar, vocals (1999–present) (also of Deathreat, Severed Head of State, Trauma , Warcry, Copout, Rueben James, His Hero Is Gone, Funeral, Call the Police, and Nightfell)
 Yannick Lorrain – guitar (1999–present) (formerly of His Hero Is Gone, Union of Uranus, and Double Think)
 Billy Davis – bass, vocals (1999–present) (also of Deathreat and Trauma; formerly of Face Down, From Ashes Rise, and Copout)
 Paul Burdette – drums (1999–present) (also of Deathreat and Criminal Damage; formerly of His Hero Is Gone, Face Down, Rueben James, Call the Police, and Well Away)

Discography

References

Musical groups established in 1995
Musical groups from Portland, Oregon
Hardcore punk groups from Tennessee
American crust and d-beat groups
Hardcore punk groups from Oregon